Michael Steele (July 24, 1861 – January 1, 1946) was a physician and political figure in Ontario, Canada. He represented Perth South in the House of Commons of Canada from 1911 to 1921 as a Conservative.

He was born in Avonbank, Canada West, the son of Thomas Steele and Joanna Todd, and was educated in St. Mary's, at the Toronto Normal School and at Trinity Medical College. He practised medicine in Tavistock. Steele was married twice: to Annie Clark in 1889 and then to Annie R. McGregor. Steele ran unsuccessfully for a seat in the House of Commons in 1904 and 1908. From 1917 to 1921, he was a member of the Unionist Party. He was defeated when he ran for reelection in 1921. He died in Vienna, Ontario at the age of 84.

References

Members of the House of Commons of Canada from Ontario
Unionist Party (Canada) MPs
Conservative Party of Canada (1867–1942) MPs
1861 births
1946 deaths